Andriy Sokolovskyy (born 16 July 1978) is a Ukrainian high jumper. His personal best jump is 2.38 metres, achieved in July 2005 in Rome (Golden Gala).

Achievements

External links

1978 births
Living people
Ukrainian male high jumpers
Athletes (track and field) at the 2004 Summer Olympics
Olympic athletes of Ukraine